William Jacob (c. 1623 – early 1692) was an English physician and politician who sat in the House of Commons briefly in 1679.

Jacob was a physician at Canterbury and was the subject of a ghost story. In September 1652 he treated a Henry Jacob for gangrene but his patient died and was buried in All Saints Church in Canterbury. Shortly afterwards Jacob was woken in his bed at night by the apparition of the deceased who "laid a cold hand on his face" and was recognisable by the distinctive cut of his beard. A maid also saw the apparition on another night. In 1670 Jacob rebuilt the Wincheap Gate in Canterbury, and was rewarded with a dinner paid for by the Corporation.

In February 1679, Jacob was elected Member of Parliament (MP) for Canterbury and held the seat until August 1679.

References

1620s births
1692 deaths
English MPs 1679
People from Canterbury
English ghosts
Politics of Canterbury
17th-century English medical doctors